Adrienne Reese (born August 31, 1988) is an American professional wrestler currently signed to All Elite Wrestling (AEW) under the ring name Athena.  She also appears in AEW's sister promotion Ring of Honor (ROH), where she is the current ROH Women's World Champion in her first reign. 

Prior to AEW/ROH, she wrestled in WWE, where she worked under the name Ember Moon. While in their developmental territory NXT, she held the NXT Women's Championship and NXT Women's Tag Team Championship, being the first to have held both titles.

Before going to WWE, she wrestled on the independent circuit as Athena for promotions such as Shimmer Women Athletes, Women Superstars Uncensored, and Anarchy Championship Wrestling, for which she is a three-time ACW American Joshi Champion.

Early life 
Reese was born in Garland, Texas on August 31, 1988. She attended Lakeview Centennial High School where she played tennis and softball as well as participating in the school's chess club and the mathlete program. During her time in high school, Reese was maliciously bullied by her peers for her interests in video games and wrestling.

When Reese was a younger child, she was introduced to wrestling by her grandfather during her visits to his house in the summer watching WWF's Raw is War or SmackDown!.

Professional wrestling career

Early career (2007–2015) 
Reese was first introduced to professional wrestling by her grandfather, and she began training under Skandor Akbar in April 2007. She later trained at Booker T's Pro Wrestling Alliance (now named Reality of Wrestling) based in Houston, Texas, and began wrestling as Trouble in 2007 and later, Athena. Athena also wrestled for various other Texas-based promotions, most notably Anarchy Championship Wrestling (ACW), based in Austin where she won the women's title, ACW American Joshi Championship three times, as well the ACW Television Championship. From 2010 to 2015, she also worked for the all-female promotions Shimmer Women Athletes and Women Superstars Uncensored.

Between 2013 and 2015, Reese worked for Ring of Honor as part of a stable by the name of Team RnB alongside A.C.H. who joined TaDarius Thomas and then the two became a ROH tag team by the name of Adrenaline Rush consisting of A.C.H and TaDarius Thomas only.

WWE (2015–2021)

NXT (2015–2018) 

In September 2015 Reese signed a contract with WWE, and was assigned to their developmental territory, NXT. She wrestled as Adrien Reese or Adrienne Reese from October 2015 until June 2016, when her name was changed to Ember Moon. After a series of introductory vignettes, Moon made her television debut at NXT TakeOver: Brooklyn II, defeating Billie Kay. Throughout the following months, Ember Moon went on a winning streak both in tag team and singles matches until losing to NXT Women's Champion Asuka at NXT TakeOver: Orlando on April 1. In May Moon sustained a shoulder injury after being thrown out of the ring by Asuka.

After she returned on June, she faced Asuka again for the championship at NXT TakeOver: Brooklyn III, but was once again defeated. In August, Asuka had to vacate the NXT Women's Championship due to an injury. On November 18, Moon won the vacant NXT Women's Championship in a fatal-four way match, defeating Royce, Nikki Cross, and Kairi Sane. As champion, Moon held the title for 140 days, feuding with Shayna Baszler. At NXT TakeOver: Philadelphia, Moon retained her title against her, but lost it at NXT TakeOver: New Orleans.

Main roster (2018–2020) 
Reese first appearance on the main roster happened at 2018 Royal Rumble, where she participated in the first women's Royal Rumble match. After losing the NXT Women's Title, she was promoted to the main roster. At Money in the Bank, she participated in the Money in the Bank ladder match, but failed to win the briefcase. At WWE Evolution she participated in a battle royal and was the last participant eliminated by Nia Jax.

At the 2019 Royal Rumble event, Moon participated in the women's Royal Rumble match, entering at number six and lasting 52 minutes before being eliminated by Alexa Bliss. During the match, she suffered an injured elbow requiring surgery, keeping her out of action. She returned at WrestleMania 35 in the WrestleMania Women's Battle Royal, from which she was eliminated by Lana. During the 2019 WWE Superstar Shake-up, Moon was moved to the SmackDown brand. In June, she participated in her second Money in the Bank ladder match but was unsuccessful.

Throughout June and July, Moon feuded with Mandy Rose and Sonya Deville, who bullied her. After losing singles matches to both Deville and Rose on the June 25 and the July 2 episodes of SmackDown, respectively, Moon teamed up with SmackDown Women's Champion Bayley to defeat Rose and Deville on the July 16 episode, ending the feud. After the match, Bayley picked Moon as her challenger for SummerSlam. However, Moon lost the match and started a losing streak, going winless in five straight televised matches. Moon would then suffer an ankle injury, and she was not in either of the draft pools for the 2019 WWE Draft in October. She appeared on the November 19 episode of WWE Backstage as an analyst and stated she would be out of action for an indefinite period of time.

Return to NXT (2020–2021) 
Resse was assigned back to NXT, where she came back with a new character. In September 2020, vignettes advertising a mysterious figure on a motorcycle appeared on NXT on consecutive weeks. The mystery figure took off her helmet and it turned out to be Moon at NXT TakeOver 31. She worked as a tag team with Shotzi Blackheart, participating in the first ever women's Dusty Rhodes Tag Team Classic, where they lost to Dakota Kai and Raquel González in the finals. They won the  NXT Women's Tag Team Championship on March 10 when they defeated Kai and González. Despite they retained the titles at NXT Takeover: Stand & Deliver against The Way (Candice LeRae and Indi Hartwell), they lost it agaist them on the May 4 episode of NXT in a Street Fight, ending their reign at 55 days. At NXT TakeOver: In Your House, Moon challenged Raquel González for the NXT Women's Championship but was defeated. On November 4, Reese was released from her contract along with various other superstars, ending her six-year tenure with the company.

Return to the independent circuit (2022) 
Reese, now going by her old ring name Athena, would challenge Thunder Rosa for the Warrior Wrestling Women's Championship on February 12. At the event, Rosa retained the title after the two wrestled to a 30-minute draw.

All Elite Wrestling (2022–present) 
Athena made her first All Elite Wrestling appearance on May 29, 2022 at Double or Nothing. She appeared at the end of Jade Cargill's match, coming to the aid of Anna Jay and Kris Statlander. On the June 3, 2022 episode of AEW Rampage, Athena wrestled in her debut AEW match against Kiera Hogan, winning via pinfall. On September 4, at All Out, Athena challenged Cargill for the AEW TBS Championship, but was unsuccessful. On September 21, at Grand Slam, Athena challenged the interim AEW Women's World Champion Toni Storm in a four-way match which also invovled Dr. Britt Baker, D.M.D. and Serena Deeb, which ended with Storm retaining the title.

Return to Ring of Honor (2022–present) 
On the November 18, 2022, episode of Rampage, after pinning Madison Rayne, Athena attacked referee Aubrey Edwards, thus turning heel only for a returning Mercedes Martinez to make a save. Since AEW President Tony Khan also owns Ring of Honor (ROH), Athena faced Martinez at ROH's event Final Battle, which took place on December 10, where she won the ROH Women's World Championship.

During her reign, Athena successfully defended her title against various contenders, such as Kiera Hogan, Marina Shafir and Miyu Yamashita. During the main event of the March 9 episode of Honor Club, Athena defended her title against Willow Nightingale.

Personal life 
Reese is married to fellow professional wrestler, Matthew Palmer. She is a fan of comic books and the 1960s Batman television series starring Adam West. Reese cited Eddie Guerrero, Victoria, Trish Stratus, Lita, Taka Michinoku, Funaki, Rikishi, Too Cool, The Rock, Kurt Angle and Beth Phoenix as her influences.

Championships and accomplishments 

 Absolute Intense Wrestling
 AIW Women's Championship (2 times)
 ACW American Joshi Championship (3 times)
 ACW Televised Championship (1 time)
 ACW Queen of Queens Tournament (2012)
 Pro Wrestling Alliance
 PWA Women's Championship (1 time)
 Pro Wrestling Illustrated
 Ranked 18 of the top 50 female wrestlers in the PWI Female 50 in 2017
 Women Superstars Uncensored / Combat Zone Wrestling
 Queen and King of the Ring (2013) – with A. R. Fox
 Ring of Honor
 ROH Women's World Championship (1 time, current)
 WWE
 NXT Women's Championship (1 time)
 NXT Women's Tag Team Championship (1 time) – with Shotzi Blackheart
 Warrior Wrestling
 Warrior Wrestling Women's Championship (1 time, current)

References

External links 

 
 
 
 
 

1988 births
African-American female professional wrestlers
All Elite Wrestling personnel
American female professional wrestlers
Living people
People from Garland, Texas
Professional wrestlers from Texas
NXT Women's Tag Team Champions
NXT Women's Champions
ROH Women's World Champions
21st-century African-American sportspeople
21st-century African-American women
20th-century African-American people
20th-century African-American women
Sportspeople from the Dallas–Fort Worth metroplex
21st-century professional wrestlers